Destination Piovarolo is a 1955 Italian comedy film directed by Domenico Paolella.

Plot summary 
In 1922, during Fascism, Antonio La Quaglia accepts the assignment to the station master in a remote town called Piovarolo, because that's where it always rains. Antonio soon realizes that life in the small village is sad, because the inhabitants are all old, deluded, dying, without hope. Antonio so hopefully he will be moved to a larger city; but the years pass and Antonio holds the same job. One day he sees off the train a beautiful lady, who does the primary school teacher. Soon the two get married and start a family, but always Antonio wants to get away from Piovarolo, but politics and the ministry do not care at all about him.

Cast  
Totò: Antonio La Quaglia
Marisa Merlini: Sara 
Irene Cefaro: Mariuccia La Quaglia 
Tina Pica: Beppa
Ernesto Almirante: Ernesto 
Arnoldo Foà: the Podestà
Enrico Viarisio:  De Fassi 
Paolo Stoppa:  Marcello Gorini 
Nando Bruno:  Sacristan
Mario Carotenuto: Outgoing station master
Giacomo Furia: De Fassi's secretary
Carlo Mazzarella: Gorini's secretary
Nino Besozzi: Minister 
Leopoldo Trieste: Minister's secretary  
Alessandra Panaro

References

External links

1955 films
1955 comedy films
Italian comedy films
Films directed by Domenico Paolella
Films set in 1922
Lux Film films
1950s Italian-language films
Italian black-and-white films
1950s Italian films